are a Japanese professional football club based in Fujieda, Shizuoka. They currently play in J2 League, the Japanese second tier of professional football. It is funded by online subscribers and is the first of its kind in Japan.

The club spent two seasons in the Japan Football League before having their application accepted in 2013 to participate in the inaugural season of J3 League in 2014.

History 
The current club was formed in 2010 as a merger of two clubs, Fujieda Nelson (named after Daishiro Yoshimura's Brazilian middle name) and Shizuoka FC. The My Football Club project bought Fujieda Nelson CF in 2008 and renamed them Fujieda MYFC. Then in 2010, My Football Club bought Shizuoka FC and merged the two clubs to form Shizuoka Fujieda MYFC. Toshihide Saito was appointed player/manager of the club.

In their first season the club finished 1st in the Tokai League Division 1 but was knocked out of the Regional League promotion series.

On 2011, they took second place in the Regional League promotion series and therefore won promotion to the Japan Football League for the first time, becoming the third representative of the prefecture in the national leagues. They then dropped the Shizuoka from their name and become just Fujieda MYFC.

In 2012, the club finished their first season in the Japan Football League in 11th place and therefore secured their place in the division for the following 2013 season.

After finishing 13th in the Japan Football League in 2013, the club were accepted in the inaugural J. League Division 3 which competed in 2014. Following the club's acceptance, player/manager Toshihide Saito decided to leave the club.

On 7 January 2014, Musashi Mizushima was appointed as manager, following Saito's resignation.

After nine seasons in the J3 League, Fujieda MYFC secured promotion to the J2 League ahead of the 2023 season. They will play at Japan's 2nd division for the first time in their history, following a 0–0 draw at Nagano Parceiro in the last matchweek. The club finished as 2022 J3 League runners-up with 67 points earned in 34 matches.

Stadium 
Fujieda play their home games at the Fujieda Sports Complex Park which has a capacity of 5,056 and was opened in 2002.

League & cup record 

Key

Honours 
Tokai League Division 1
Champions: (2) - 2010, 2011
Shizuoka Prefecture Cup
Champions: (2) - 2013, 2014
J3 League
Runners-up: (1) - 2022

Current squad 
As of 8 January 2023.

Out on loan

Coaching staff 
For the 2023 season.

Managerial history

Records

Emperor's Cup Record 
Fujieda have qualified for the main Emperor's Cup competition four times.

Kit evolution

References

External links 
 Official site
 Unofficial English blog

 
Football clubs in Japan
Association football clubs established in 2009
Sports teams in Shizuoka Prefecture
Fan-owned football clubs
2009 establishments in Japan
Japan Football League clubs
J.League clubs